The Baliem River Valley tree frog (Litoria umbonata) is a species of frog in the subfamily Pelodryadinae, endemic to West Papua, Indonesia. Its natural habitats are subtropical or tropical high-altitude grassland, freshwater marshes, and rural gardens.

References

Litoria
Amphibians of Western New Guinea
Amphibians described in 1983
Taxonomy articles created by Polbot